Vasyl Yurchenko(alternate spellings: Vasily Yurchenko, Vasiliy Jurtzhenko, born 26 May 1950) is a Soviet-born Ukrainian sprint canoeist who competed from the early 1970s to the early 1980s. Competing in three Summer Olympics, he won two medals. This included one silver (C-1 1000 m: 1976) and one bronze (C-2 1000 m: 1980).

Yurchenko had better success at the ICF Canoe Sprint World Championships, winning 12 medals. This included seven golds (C-1 1000 m: 1974, 1975; C-1 10000 m: 1973, 1975; C-2 1000 m: 1977, 1979; C-2 10000 m: 1979), four silvers (C-1 10000 m: 1971, 1974, 1977, 1978), and one bronze (C-2 500 m: 1977).

His daughter Kateryna competed for Ukraine in canoeing at the 1996 Summer Olympics in Atlanta.

References

External links

1950 births
Canoeists at the 1972 Summer Olympics
Canoeists at the 1976 Summer Olympics
Canoeists at the 1980 Summer Olympics
Living people
Soviet male canoeists
Ukrainian male canoeists
Olympic canoeists of the Soviet Union
Olympic silver medalists for the Soviet Union
Olympic bronze medalists for the Soviet Union
Olympic medalists in canoeing
ICF Canoe Sprint World Championships medalists in Canadian

Medalists at the 1980 Summer Olympics
Medalists at the 1976 Summer Olympics